Clare Burt is an English actress and singer, best known for her stage work and for her appearance on the television series The Bill.

Biography
As a child she attended the Sylvia Young Theatre School.

Burt is a member of the National Theatre company and has played in many productions, including: London Road, The Miracle, and as Mrs. Milcote in the 2006 production of Helen Edmundson's Coram Boy. Her other productions include: Vernon God Little, Closer Than Ever, Company, Into the Woods, Nine, Spread a Little Happiness, Cat on a Hot Tin Roof, and Pal Joey.

Her West End roles include Grizabella in Cats (New London Theatre), Rose Vibert in Aspects of Love (Prince of Wales Theatre), Celeste in Sunday in the Park with George (Royal National Theatre), Fosca in Passion (Bridewell) and two new musicals by Howard Goodall: The Hired Man (London Astoria) and Girlfriends (Playhouse Theatre).

Burt will star as theatre director Joan Littlewood in a new musical Miss Littlewood for the Royal Shakespeare Company in summer 2018.

In 2020, she played Mo Cassidy in the BBC drama, The Salisbury Poisonings.

Burt was in a relationship with Larry Lamb from 1996 until 2016. They had two daughters.

Filmography
Burt's filmography includes:
Holby City (television series, 2004, 2021-2022)
The Bill (television series, 1989–2005)
The Christmas Miracle of Jonathan Toomey (film, 2007)
Criminal Justice (television mini-series, 2008)
Broken (2012)
The Salisbury Poisonings (2020)

References

External links 

Living people
Alumni of the Sylvia Young Theatre School
English musical theatre actresses
English television actresses
Year of birth missing (living people)